Béla Endre (19 November 1870, in Szeged – 12 August 1928, in Mártély) was a Hungarian painter and designer, one of the most prominent representatives of the .

Biography
He was born in the famous "" of Szeged, built by his grandfather, the merchant Ferdinand Mayer (1817–1903).

In 1912, he helped to establish the "Majolica and Clay Artists' Society" (Művészek Majolika és Agyagipari Telep-ének) and held his first exhibition in Hódmezővásárhely. He held further exhibits in Makó (1913) and Arad (1914), which was a joint showing with his studio partners. 

From 1910 until his death, he spent his summers in Mártély, painting the people and the landscapes of the Great Hungarian Plain.

In 1970, to commemorate the 100th anniversary of his birth, memorial exhibitions were held in Hódmezővásárhely, Budapest and Szeged. In 2005, a permanent memorial was opened at the Ópusztaszer National Heritage Park.

Sources
 László Emőke: Endre Béla festészete. Móra Ferenc Múzeum (1968) Online ISSN 2064-8480
 László Emőke: "Endre Béla", Art Library, Vol.85, Corvina Kiadó (1973) Listing

External links

 Körber Ágnes, Magyar művészeti kislexikon kezdetektől napjainkig, Enciklopédia Kiadó, 2002  Online
 Biographical notes @ the Magyar életrajzi lexikon

1870 births
1928 deaths
Hungarian painters
Landscape painters
Great Hungarian Plain
People from Szeged
Académie Julian